The following table provides a summary of the complete record of each Lebanon manager, including their progress in both the World Cup and the Asian Cup.

Last updated: Lebanon vs Iran, 29 March 2022. Statistics include official FIFA-recognised matches only.

Notes

References

 
Lebanon
managers